Konstantinos "Kostas" Kakaroudis (born May 2, 1983) is a Greek professional basketball player who last played for Iraklis of the Greek Basket League. He is a 2.04 m (6' 8") tall power forward. He was born in Serres, Greece.

Professional career
In his pro career, Kakaroudis played with some of the following clubs: Aris, Thermaikos, KAOD (2004–2006), Ionikos Lamias, Panorama, Rethymno, Olympias Patras, Ikaroi Serron, KAOD (2011–2013), Rovinari, and Kolossos. In 2014, he joined PAOK. In 2015, he signed a new 2-year contract with PAOK. In 2016, he moved to Faros. Kakaroudis spent the subsequent three seasons with Iraklis, achieving a promotion to the Greek Basket League in 2019, as well as clinching a qualification for European competitions in 2020. On July 13, 2020, he personally announced his departure from the club.

National team career
Kakaroudis was a member of Greece's junior national college team that played at the 2007 World University Championship.

Awards and accomplishments
FIBA EuroCup Challenge Champion: (2003)

References

External links
EuroCup Profile
FIBA Europe Profile 
Eurobasket.com Profile
Greek Basket League Profile 
Draftexpress.com Profile

1983 births
Living people
Aris B.C. players
CS Energia Rovinari players
Faros Keratsiniou B.C. players
Greek men's basketball players
Greek Basket League players
Ionikos Lamias B.C. players
Iraklis Thessaloniki B.C. players
K.A.O.D. B.C. players
Kavala B.C. players
Kolossos Rodou B.C. players
Olympias Patras B.C. players
P.A.O.K. BC players
Power forwards (basketball)
Rethymno B.C. players
Small forwards
Basketball players from Serres